Republika was an Indonesian national daily newspaper. The newspaper was known, and described itself, as a publication for the Muslim community. The paper ceased publication in December 2022 and transition to online.

Republika was founded in 1992 and the first edition was published on January 4, 1993, by Yayasan Abdi Bangsa, a foundation that supported by Ikatan Cendekiawan Muslim Indonesia (ICMI), which at the time was chaired by B. J. Habibie (1936–2019). After B. J. Habibie ceased being president in 1999, and in line with declining of the ICMI's political role, the majority of ownership was taken by Mahaka Media in late 2000. Republika then was published by PT Republika Media Mandiri, a subsidiary of Mahaka Media, and has become a general Indonesian newspaper.

References

External links
 
 Official site - English version

Indonesian press
Newspapers published in Jakarta
Publications established in 1993
Publications disestablished in 2022
1993 establishments in Indonesia
Defunct newspapers published in Indonesia
Online newspapers with defunct print editions
Indonesian news websites